Joe the Menace (Greek: , Tzo o tromeros) is a 1955 Greek comedy film. It was directed by Dinos Dimopoulos and stars Dinos Iliopoulos, Margarita Papandreou, Hristos Tsaganeas and Nikos Rizos.

Plot 
After one month of planning, the first-time safe-breaker, Joe, tries to rob a haughty Russian aristocrat, only to realize that someone else has already emptied the safe of its contents. Can he convince every one of his tainted innocence?

Cast
Dinos Iliopoulos as Joe Rouvakas
Christos Tsaganeas as Lavrentis Kalliris
Nikos Rizos as Gardelis
Pantelis Zervos as police captain
Margarita Papageorgiou as Nadia
Giannis Argyris as boss
Giorgos Damasiotis as Georgis
Dionysis Papagiannopoulos as Giannis Karoubas

References

External links

Joe o tromeros at cine.gr

Greek comedy films
1955 films
Greek thriller films
1955 comedy films
1950s Greek-language films
Greek black-and-white films